Sarge is a 1976 album by Delroy Wilson, originally released on the LTD label in Jamaica and the Charmers label in the UK. The album was produced and arranged by Lloyd Charmers, and featured the biggest selling reggae single of 1976, Wilson's cover version of Bob Marley's "I'm Still Waiting". The single's success led to a similarly themed album, with Wilson singing versions of well-known songs over Charmers' arrangements, including covers of "My Conversation", "My Cecilia" and "Too Late for the Learning". Sarge was chosen as one of 100 "essential reggae CDs" by Rough Guides and is widely regarded as Wilson's best album.

The album was re-issued in 1986 on Trojan Records.

Track listing
"I'm Still Waiting"
"My Conversation"
"Moving Away"
"I Don't Want To See You Cry"
"My Cecelia"
"Ain't That Loving You"
"Got A Date"
"Every Body Needs Love"
"Green Green Grass Of Home"
"Too Late For The Learning"

Personnel
Vocals: Delroy Wilson
Drums: Derrick Stewart, Mikey "Boo" Richards
Bass guitar: Val Douglas
Brass: Roots Casanovas
Guitar: Willie Lindo
Keyboards: Lloyd Charmers, Harold Butler
Backing vocals: The Charmers
Special Effects: Lloyd Charmers
Producer: Lloyd Charmers
Engineer: George Raymond & Frank Aggarat

References

External links
Delroy Wilson - Sarge, Roots Archives

1976 albums
Delroy Wilson albums